Sir Francis Throckmorton, 2nd Baronet (1641–1680), of Coughton Court, Warwickshire and Weston Underwood, Buckinghamshire, was a member of a prominent English family of Roman Catholic dissenters.

Origins
Francis was born in 1641, the  son of Sir Robert Throckmorton, 1st Baronet (d.1650) by  his second wife Mary Smyth, daughter of Sir Francis Smyth (d.1629) of Ashby Folville and Queensborough, Leicestershire and Wootton Wawen, Warwickshire, by Anne Markham. His uncle was Charles Smyth, 1st Viscount Carrington.

Marriage
 
He married Anne Monson (d.1728), daughter of John Monson, a Catholic and eldest son  of Admiral Sir William Monson (1569–1643) of Kinnersley Manor, Horley, Surrey and Croft and Skegness in Lincolnshire. Anne sold Kinnersley in 1666.

Death and burial
His will was granted probate in 1681.

Private life

He and Anne had the following children:
Mary Throckmorton, married Martin Wollascot.
Sir Robert Throckmorton, 3rd Baronet (1662-1720/1)
Anne Throckmorton (1664-1734), Abbess 1720-1728 of the English  Augustinian Convent of Notre-Dame-de-Sion, Paris.
George Throckmorton (1671-1705), had a religious life, a Jansenist dévot 
Sir Francis and his wife, Anne, separated in 1677 and she went to live in a convent in Paris.

Sources
thePeerage.com

References

 
 

1641 births
1680 deaths
Baronets in the Baronetage of England
Francis
17th-century English people